Dr. David Breakstone (born 31 March 1953) is the Executive Director of the Yitzhak Navon Center for a Shared Society, currently being established in Israel. He previously served as Vice Chairman of the Jewish Agency executive, first alongside Natan Sharansky and then alongside Isaac (Bougie) Herzog, just before his becoming Israel's president. Prior to holding that position, Breakstone was elected to the post of Deputy Chair of the World Zionist Organization and served as the conceputal architect and founding director of its Herzl Museum and Educational Center, During his two decades in Israel's National Institutions, he also served as a member of the Executive of Keren Hayesod and the Directorate of Keren Kayemeth LeIsrael (Jewish National Fund)..

An educator by training, Dr. Breakstone earlier served as Director of the Hebrew University's Pedagogic Center for Jewish education in the Diaspora, as Associate Dean and Director of Education at the Schechter Institute of Jewish Studies, and as Director of Ramah Programs in Israel. He is also the founder of Israel ArchiTexts - Designing Engagement with the Jewish State, specializing in educational tourism.

As a volunteer, Dr. Breakstone currently serves on the executive of Yad Vashem, the directorate of the Ethiopian National Project, as an advisor to Achva (promoting the recognition of the Abayudaya Jewish community of Uganda), and as a member of the board of Kulanu, where he continues the work that has occupied him for years in promoting the wellbeing of emerging and developing Jewish communities around the world. He has also been active in the Masorti / Conservative Movement for decades, having served as both chairman and treasurer of the movement in Israel, supervisor of the TALI Education Fund, Chairman of the Educational Center at Kibbutz Hannaton, and Chairman of the Executive of the Schechter Institute, where he continues to serve as a member of the board. 

Dr. Breakstone has published numerous articles, books, and pedagogic materials on Jewish education, the teaching of Israel, Israel-Diaspora relations, Zionism, contemporary Jewish Affairs, and Conservative Judaism – all topics on which he lectures extensively.  For a number of years he penned a regular column in the weekend magazine of The Jerusalem Post entitled "Keep dreaming," and he continues to publish there as well as blogging for The Times of Israel, dealing primarily with contemporary issues in Israeli society, particularly as they relate to the life of the Jewish community worldwide. 

Dr. Breakstone earned his doctorate at Hebrew University in the Institute of Contemporary Jewry, specializing in the teaching of Israel. He made aliyah from the United States in 1974, and performed his army service in the Education Corps of the Israel Defense Forces. He lives in Jerusalem with his Chilean-born wife, Gabriela.

References

External links
 David Breakstone at the site of the Jewish Agency's Board of Governors

People from Jerusalem
Israeli Conservative Jews
Jewish Agency for Israel
1953 births
Living people
Hebrew University of Jerusalem alumni
Place of birth missing (living people)